Jolly Ehigiator Oyekpen was an Anglican bishop in Nigeria.

Oyekpen was born in Iruekpen, Edo State on the 7th of September 1966 and educated at Obafemi Awolowo University. He was Bishop of Akoko-Edo until 2022. He died on the 29th of August 2022 at the University of Benin Teaching Hospital.

Notes

Living people
Obafemi Awolowo University alumni
Anglican bishops of Akoko Edo
21st-century Anglican bishops in Nigeria
Year of birth missing (living people)